Hockey is an ice hockey video game for the Atari Lynx, developed by American studio Alpine Software and published by Atari Corporation.

Gameplay

Development and release

Reception 

Hockey was met with mostly positive reception. Robert Jung reviewed the game which has been published on IGN gave Hockey a score of 7 out of 10.

References

External links 
 Hockey at AtariAge
 Hockey at MobyGames

1992 video games
Atari games
Atari Lynx games
Atari Lynx-only games
Ice hockey video games
Multiplayer and single-player video games
Video games developed in the United States
Video games scored by Alex Rudis